Ivo Lola Ribar Institute is a Serbian manufacturer of heavy machine tools, robotics, industrial equipment and industrial computers, headquartered in Belgrade, Serbia. It has been named after People's Hero of Yugoslavia Ivo Lola Ribar, the youngest son of Ivan Ribar.

Ivo Lola Ribar Institute was founded in 1963 by decree of the Government of Serbia. In current form, it operates since 31 December 1985. During the 1980s, it was one of the leading technology institutes in former Yugoslavia.

See also
 Lola 8 – computer developed by Ivo Lola Ribar Institute in late 1980s.
 PA512 and LPA512 – industrial controllers developed by ILR
 History of computer hardware in Yugoslavia
 List of computer systems from Yugoslavia

References

External links
Ivo Lola Ribar Institute
Slitter Rewinder Machines

Computer companies of Serbia
Electronics companies established in 1963
1963 establishments in Serbia
Companies based in Belgrade
Computer hardware companies
Machine manufacturers